Claibourne could refer to one of many places.

United States 
 Claibourne Township, Union County, Ohio
 Claibourne, Ohio

Fictional 
 Claibourne, part of the Kingdom of Gwynedd in the Deryni novels of Katherine Kurtz.